Nawaf Al-Dhafairi (born 16 July 1971) is a Kuwaiti former footballer. He competed in the men's tournament at the 1992 Summer Olympics.

References

External links
 

1971 births
Living people
Kuwaiti footballers
Kuwait international footballers
Olympic footballers of Kuwait
Footballers at the 1992 Summer Olympics
Place of birth missing (living people)
Association football defenders
Asian Games bronze medalists for Kuwait
Asian Games medalists in football
Footballers at the 1990 Asian Games
Footballers at the 1994 Asian Games
Medalists at the 1994 Asian Games
Kuwait Premier League players